The Leiper-Scott House is a historic house at 312 South Pulaski Street in Little Rock, Arkansas.  It is a single-story brick structure, with a hip roof adorned with gabled and hipped projections and dormers in an asymmetrical style typical of the Queen Anne period.  A porch extends across part of the front around to the side, supported by Tuscan columns mounted on brick piers, with a balustrade between them.  The house was built in 1902 for Eric Leiper, owner of a local brickyard, and is locally unusual as a relatively modestly-scaled house built in brick.

The house was listed on the National Register of Historic Places in 1980.

See also
National Register of Historic Places listings in Little Rock, Arkansas

References

Houses on the National Register of Historic Places in Arkansas
Queen Anne architecture in Arkansas
Colonial Revival architecture in Arkansas
Houses completed in 1902
Houses in Little Rock, Arkansas
National Register of Historic Places in Little Rock, Arkansas